Hans Kristensen (born 25 September 1941) is a Danish film director, screenwriter, and actor. He has directed eleven feature films since 1973.

Filmography

References

External links

1941 births
Living people
Danish film directors
Danish male screenwriters